Kalwant Singh may refer to the following persons: 

 Kalwant Singh (drug trafficker)
 Kalwant Singh (general)